Michal Ondráček (born 8 June 1973) is a retired Czech football player who played in the Czech First League for FC Baník Ostrava and SK České Budějovice. He later played for clubs including MFK Karviná and FC Hlučín.

References

External links
 
 

1973 births
Living people
Czech footballers
Czech Republic under-21 international footballers
Association football defenders
Czech First League players
FC Baník Ostrava players
SK Dynamo České Budějovice players
MFK Karviná players
FC Hlučín players
FK Frýdek-Místek players
FC Fastav Zlín players
FK Fotbal Třinec players